Roman Isaac Walker (born 6 August 2000) is a Welsh cricketer, who played internationally for England at age-group level. He made his List A debut on 7 May 2019, for Glamorgan in the 2019 Royal London One-Day Cup. Prior to his List A debut, he was named in England's squad for the 2018 Under-19 Cricket World Cup. He made his Twenty20 debut on 24 August 2019, for Glamorgan in the 2019 t20 Blast. He made his first-class debut on 20 July 2022, for Leicestershire in the 2022 County Championship.

References

External links
 

2000 births
Living people
Welsh cricketers
Glamorgan cricketers
Leicestershire cricketers
Sportspeople from Wrexham